Bosler is a surname. Notable people with the surname include:

Jean Bosler (1878–1973), French astronomer and author
John Bosler (born 1933), Australian rugby union player 
Nan Bosler (born 1935), Australian community activist and advocate
Virginia Bosler (1926–2020), American actress

See also
Bosley (surname)